Mamta Devi is an Indian politician from Jharkhand and a member of the Indian National Congress. She was a member of the Jharkhand Legislative Assembly from Ramgarh. She has been also a Member of Zila Parishad, Ramgarh.

References

Indian National Congress politicians from Jharkhand
Living people
Jharkhand MLAs 2019–2024
Year of birth missing (living people)
Women members of the Jharkhand Legislative Assembly
21st-century Indian women politicians
21st-century Indian politicians